The village of Ribeiro Frio ("Cold Stream" in English) is situated in the interior of the island of Madeira. It belongs to the parish of São Roque do Faial, the municipality of Santana, and is located around 15 kilometers from Funchal.

The little village is known for its trout farm. It is much visited by many tourists as it is a starting point for many levada walks, one leading to Balcões.

It is located 860 meters high, in a location surrounded by some woods of especially endemic species of laurel, such as the laurel (Laurus novocanariensis) and heather undergrowth (Erica madeirensis). It is also populated by native birds of the island such as the trocaz pigeon, the chaffinch (Fringilla coelebs madeirensis) and Madeira firecrest (Regulus madeirensis).

Gallery

External links 

Villages in Portugal
Madeira Island